Durdin may refer to:
Đurđin, Serbia
Durdin, Iran, a village in Kerman Province, Iran